Shelton is an English village and civil parish in the Rushcliffe borough of Nottinghamshire. According to the 2001 census, Shelton had a population of 107,. At the 2011 census, the statistics for Shelton included Sibthorpe, and the population was 307. It has no parish council, only a parish meeting.

Heritage
The parish church of St Mary is Norman. The west tower was removed in 1837 and replaced with a bellcote. It has a Saxon cross shaft with interlace work. Shelton Hall to the west of the church dates from the late 18th century.

Transport
The village is served by twice-weekly Nottsbus Connect buses (Tuesday and Thursday) between Bottesford, Bingham and Lowdham. The nearest railway station is at Bottesford (5.5 miles/9 km), with services between Nottingham and Grantham or Skegness.

References

External links

Villages in Nottinghamshire
Civil parishes in Nottinghamshire
Rushcliffe